Tempted may refer to:

Books
Tempted (von Ziegesar novel), a 2008 novel in The It Girl series
Tempted (Cast novel), a 2009 novel by P. C. Cast

Music
Tempted (album), a 1991 album by Marty Stuart
Tempted (album), 1994 album by Waterlillies
"Tempted" (Marty Stuart song), its title track
"Tempted" (Squeeze song), song by Squeeze and covered by other artists 1981
"Tempted" (Jazz Cartier song), song by Jazz Cartier, 2017
"Tempted", song by Jess Conrad	1964
"Tempted", song by John Verity	1987
"Tempted", song by Johnny Williams (blues musician) 1968
"Tempted", song by Jon English And The Foster Brothers 1982

Film and television
Tempted (film), a 2001 American film
Tempted (TV series), a 2018 South Korean TV series

Horse racing
Tempted (horse) (born 1955), American racehorse
Tempted Stakes, annual horse race at Aqueduct Race Track in Queens, New York